The Providence Fruit and Produce Warehouse Company Building was a historic building located at 6-64 Harris Avenue in Providence, Rhode Island.  The building, a large three story warehouse facility, was built in 1929 by Jenks & Ballou, architects and engineers, with modest Moderne styling.  The building served from 1929 to 1998 as the major distribution center for fresh fruits and vegetables in the state of Rhode Island, and was one of the centerpieces of the provisioning warehouse district of Providence north of the city center.  Several of its bays were demolished in the 1980s to make way for a highway ramp, and the building was taken over by the state in 1998 and closed.  The building was listed on the National Register of Historic Places in 2005.

The building was demolished in 2008 by Carpionato Properties to great controversy from local government and citizens.

See also
National Register of Historic Places listings in Providence, Rhode Island

References

Buildings and structures in Providence, Rhode Island
Commercial buildings on the National Register of Historic Places in Rhode Island
Agricultural buildings and structures on the National Register of Historic Places in Rhode Island
Warehouses on the National Register of Historic Places
Agricultural buildings and structures on the National Register of Historic Places
Commercial buildings completed in 1929
Demolished buildings and structures in Rhode Island
National Register of Historic Places in Providence, Rhode Island
Buildings and structures demolished in 2008